Doneraile Court is a late-17th century country house ear the town of Doneraile in County Cork which stands in  of walled parkland. It remained the seat of the St Leger family from the time of construction until the mid-20th century.

The park is open all year with free admission.

History
The  estate, together with other lands, was purchased in 1629 by Sir William St. Leger, Lord President of Munster, who moved into the 13th-century Doneraile Castle. By 1645 the castle had been attacked and burned several times and was so badly damaged that it had to be abandoned.

The present house was constructed in its place in the late 1600s, utilising some of the stonework of the old castle. It was extensively remodelled and the current facade added in 1725 by architect Isaac Rothery. Over the years various extensions were added such as an octagonal kitchen and game store built in 1869. A dining room built at the same time and a nine bay Gothic Revival style conservatory built in 1825 have since been demolished. Other improvements within the estate included cottages, lodges, farm buildings and stables. The St. Leger family owned and bred horses for hunting and racing on the estate. 

The remaining demesne land, which now comprises Doneraile Wildlife Park, was sold to the government in 1943, followed by the house itself in 1969 when the last St Leger occupier left.

When Doneraile Court was the residence of Lord Castletown, Oliver Wendell Holmes Jr., who had been a soldier in the American Civil War, and became a lawyer and United States Supreme Court justice, carried on an extensive correspondence with Clare, Lady Castletown. He visited Doneraile on several occasions, and may have had an affair with her. 

The grounds in the vicinity of the house is laid out in the style of Capability Brown whilst the deer park contains Killarney Red, Sika and Fallow deer and the meadows a herd of Kerry cattle.

References

Buildings and structures in County Cork
Houses in the Republic of Ireland
Gardens in County Cork